Orciprenaline, also known as metaproterenol, is a bronchodilator used in the treatment of asthma. Orciprenaline is a moderately selective β2 adrenergic receptor agonist that stimulates receptors of the smooth muscle in the lungs, uterus, and vasculature supplying skeletal muscle, with minimal or no effect on α adrenergic receptors. The pharmacologic effects of β adrenergic agonist drugs, such as orciprenaline, are at least in part attributable to stimulation through β adrenergic receptors of intracellular adenylyl cyclase, the enzyme which catalyzes the conversion of ATP to cAMP. Increased cAMP levels are associated with relaxation of bronchial smooth muscle and inhibition of release of mediators of immediate hypersensitivity from many cells, especially from mast cells.


Possible side effects 
 tremor
 nervousness
 dizziness
 weakness
 headache
 nausea
 tachycardia

Rare side effects that could be life-threatening
 increased difficulty breathing
 rapid or increased heart rate
 irregular heartbeat
 chest pain or discomfort

Brand names 
 Alupent
 Metaprel
 Orcibest

References 

Chemical substances for emergency medicine
Phenylethanolamines
Bronchodilators